Oaș Country (Romanian: Țara Oașului, Hungarian: Avasság) is an ethnographic  and historical   region of Romania located in the North-East part of Satu Mare County, 50 km from the city of Satu Mare, also 50 km from the city of Baia Mare.
The  capital of Oaș Country is  Negrești-Oaș town.

Boundaries 
The Oaș Country extends from Turț – Gherța Mare – Gherța Mică (on the western side) all the way to Huta pass situated at an altitude of 604 m (in the East), from Cămărzana (in the North) to the mountains that surround Orașu Nou, Racșa and Vama (in the South).

Communes 
The Oaș Country comprises the following communes:
 Orașu Nou
 Certeze
 Vama
 Călinești-Oaș
 Târșolț
 Bixad
 Cămărzana

Geography 
The Oaș Depression has maximum altitudes of 400–500 m. Most of the human dwellings are situated alongside the river  valleys that cross the Oaș Depression.  In the Northern part of the depression there is the Lechincioara Basin which includes the Mare, Semănaturii and Lechincioarei valleys. In the southern part of Oaș Country there are the Tur, Alb, and Rău rivers.

History 
The first document that mentioned the Oaș Country dates from 1270, when the King of Hungary donated to a nobleman several villages from the southwestern boundary of the "country".

In that document the Oaș Country is mentioned as Terra Awas.  Some historians claim that the origin of the word "Oaș" is the "Awas", which means a kind of deforestation or a clearing in the woods.

The Oaș Country was mentioned in the Chronicles of Grigore Ureche.

Gallery

References

External links
Presentation
Pictures of Oaș Country
http://www.oas.ro/
http://www.incogniterra.org/pages/events/sambra.html

 
Transylvania0
Historical regions in the Kingdom of Hungary
Tara Oasului